The 29th RTHK Top 10 Gold Songs Awards was held in 2007 for the 2006 music season.

Top 10 song awards
The top 10 songs (十大中文金曲) of 2007 are as follows.

Other awards

References
 Hunan TV Entertainment

RTHK Top 10 Gold Songs Awards
2007 in Hong Kong
2007 music awards